Lavan Rural District is a rural district (dehestan) in the Kish District of Bandar Lengeh County, Hormozgan Province, Iran. At the 2006 census, its population was 891, in 172 families.  The rural district has 2  villages. The rural district covers Lavan Island and Shidvar Island.

References 

Rural Districts of Hormozgan Province
Bandar Lengeh County